The Convent is a 2000 horror film directed by Mike Mendez, featuring horror veteran Adrienne Barbeau. The film is about a group of college students that go into an abandoned convent, only to discover that it is inhabited by demons intent on possessing them. It premiered in January 2000 at the Sundance Film Festival. Due to the original distributor closing, the film was not released on home video until December 2002.

Plot
A young Christine breaks into a convent and systematically kills every nun she comes across before setting fire to the place and leaving. The convent becomes an abandoned building and, years later, is a popular place for college students to break in and vandalize, as it is reported to be haunted. It is particularly popular for sororities and fraternities to break in and try to spray-paint their letters on the bell tower, which is where Clorissa is headed that very night with her friends. She is joined by her old goth friend Mo, her nerdy brother Brant, ex-fraternity brother Frijole, the cheerleader Kaitlin and her dog, and fraternity brothers Chad and Biff.

At the convent, Biff and Frijole immediately start bullying Brant under the pretense that it is just routine hazing that all must go through in order to join the fraternity. This irritates Clorissa, who unsuccessfully tries to convince Brant that he should blow them off. Once inside, the group begins to explore the convent but are stopped by the arrival of two police officers that force them to leave and take a joint that one of them had been holding. Scared to lose her scholarship if she gets caught by the cops, Mo decides to stay and hide in the convent, having persuaded Frijole to cover for her by promising him they would have sex. The group then goes to a diner, where Frijole tells the group that they must go back for Mo as well as a large stash of pot that he left in the convent.

Back in the convent, Mo has been grabbed by a group of Satanists that are intent on sacrificing her as part of a ritual to give its leader Saul power and summon Satan to earth. As Mo listens to the group talk to one another, she realizes that while they are all ridiculously gothic pretentious and have no idea what they are doing, they are serious about killing her. She tries to talk them out of it but is ultimately unsuccessful. After she is stabbed in the heart by one of the Satanists, Mo is immediately possessed by one of the demons that were already inhabiting the convent and begins slaying everyone in the group except Saul and Dickie-Boy, who manage to escape. Meanwhile, the others have returned to the convent where they are also murdered one by one, until only Clorissa and Brant remain. Saul kidnaps Brant in the hopes of sacrificing him to Satan and sending the demons back, but Brant manages to escape and Saul is quickly killed and converted by the demons. Brant doesn't get far, as he and Dickie-Boy then get taken by the demons with the intent to use them in a sacrifice.

Clorissa makes her way to the convent and flees to the house of a now-grown Christine, who tells her the full story of the convent, which also served as an orphanage and home for pregnant teens. Christine admits that she did attack the nuns and the priest running the place, but it was because they had become possessed by demons and intended to take her baby and use him to create the Anti-Christ. She saved her son, but had to spend years in a mental institution as a result. Christine then goes on to say that every few years, college students break into the convent and become possessed by demons, but that little comes of it because she managed to fight them off and because none of them were virgins (meaning that Mo's claims of virginity were false), as only a virgin can become the Anti-Christ. Upon hearing that Brant is a virgin, Christine and Clorissa return to the convent to fight. They manage to fight off most of the demons but are unable to stop them from killing Dickie-Boy (who was also a virgin), who becomes the Anti-Christ. Christine then urges Clorissa and Brant to flee, as she will blow up the convent with herself and the Anti-Christ inside, as it is the only way to ensure that it will not escape. Clorissa and Brant escape the convent and find that the only other survivor is Kaitlin's dog, which Clorissa takes home with her. Once at home, Clorissa lies down on her bed to digest everything that happened and is promptly attacked by the dog, as it was also possessed by one of the demons.

Cast

Production
Convents original script was written by Chaton Anderson with additional ideas contributed by director Mike Mendez. Anderson recalled that the script went back to her own childhood memories, recalling an eerie building she knew growing up that was a "religious home for runaway girls" that was abandoned for years. Anderson and her friends broke into it when they were either 14 or 15 recalling it as "the most dilapidated and sinister place I'd ever set foot in." Mendez recalled both Evil Dead 2 and Lamberto Bava's film Demons being an influence on Convent.

The film was shot in Los Angeles in 1999 and had a budget of half a million dollars from Alpine Pictures. It had a shooting schedule of 18 days.

Release
The film debuted at the Sundance Film Festival on January 22, 2000 as a special midnight screening. Mendez reflected on the screening in 2018, recalling it to be "really fun" and that "The whole festival run for that film was tremendous, to be honest. It kind of spoiled me. My future films had to live up to the festival experiences with The Convent, and often they didn't."

On initial festival screenings, Mendez said that audiences approached him who stated the film did not accurately showcase Satanists which Mendez responded with "We were just having fun. You're right, we didn't do our proper research, but if we did it wouldn't be as funny. The Convent is an equal opportunity offender." Mendez also spoke about a critic who approached him about the film's sole homosexual character who one character is afraid of, and then having him become the Antichrist. Mendez responded that the critic was "looking too deeply into it. There is no message."

The film was given an NC-17 rating from the MPAA. Mendez recalled the issue was the film being "too bloody", and was re-sent and re-edited twice to the MPAA to get an R-Rating. The film was cut 19 seconds for this rating.

The Convent was originally set to be released by the distributor A-Pix who went defunct. The film had been released as a bootleg prior to this on eBay and horror conventions. The film was released on VHS and DVD on December 11, 2002 by Trimark.

Reception
Critical reception for The Convent has been mixed.

References

Sources

External links 
 
 

2000 films
2000 independent films
2000s supernatural horror films
American direct-to-video films
American independent films
American supernatural horror films
Direct-to-video horror films
Films about nuns
Films about Satanism
Films scored by Joseph Bishara
2000s English-language films
2000s American films